What's In The Bag? is the ninth studio album by singer/songwriter Marshall Crenshaw.

Track listing
All songs written by Marshall Crenshaw, except where noted.
"Will We Ever?" – 4:06
"Where Home Used to Be" – 4:54
"Take Me with U" (Prince) – 3:46
"From Now Until Then" – 4:06
"Despite the Sun" – 4:54
"The Spell Is Broken" (Crenshaw, David Cantor) – 4:12
"A Few Thousand Days Ago" (Crenshaw, Bill Demaine) – 4:04
"Long and Complicated" (Crenshaw, Richard Julian) – 5:35
"I'd Rather Be with You" (Bootsy Collins, George Clinton, Gary Lee Cooper) – 4:27
"Alone in a Room" – 3:39
"AKA A Big Heavy Hot Dog" – 4:00

Personnel
Marshall Crenshaw - vocals, guitar, bass, drums, percussion, organ, mellotron, mandoguitar
Diego Voglino – drums
Tony Scherr – bass
Chris Cunningham – guitar
Andy York – guitar, bass, mandoguitar
Bill Ware – vibraphone
Jason Crigler – guitar
Graham Maby – bass
Tony Beckham – vibraphone
Greg Leisz – steel guitar
Jane Scarpantoni – cello
Eric Ambel – dulcitar, bass
Tom Teeley – guitar

References 

2003 albums
Marshall Crenshaw albums
Razor & Tie albums